Ottavio Ottavi (15 August 1849 – 12 January 1893) was an Italian oenologist.

Biography
Ottavi was born in Sandigliano. His father Giuseppe Antonio Ottavio was an agronomist, and his brother Edoardo, editor of the journal Il Coltivatore, was also seen as a significant figure in the development of nineteenth-century Italian viticulture.

He was the author of various treatises and monographs, including Enologia teorico-pratica (1898), and was the founder of the Giornale vinicolo italiano. His Inno ai Krumiri (1886) is a "hymn" to the krumiro, a type of biscuit created in Casale Monferrato, the town where he largely lived and where he died in 1893.

References

External links
 Photograph and details of his commemorative plaque, sculpted by Leonardo Bistolfi, in Casale Monferrato.

People from the Province of Biella
People from Casale Monferrato
Oenologists
Italian male writers
1849 births
1893 deaths